Markus Pleuler (born 10 May 1970) is a German football manager and former player who played as a midfielder. He played in the Bundesliga for SSV Ulm 1846.

Club career

Early career
Born in Bad Urach, Pleuler grew up in Hülben, playing youth football for SV Hülben and TSV Urach, before joining SSV Reutlingen's academy as a 13 year old in 1983. Having joined their first team in 1988, Pleuler made 94 appearances for Reutlingen between 1990 and 1994, scoring 10 goals.

SSV Ulm 1846
In 1994, Pleuler joined Regionalliga Süd side SSV Ulm 1846. Pleuler played regularly at the club and in 1998, the club was promoted to the second tier of German football, the 2. Bundesliga. Pleuler scored two goals in 23 games as the club was promoted to the Bundesliga at the end of the season. Over the course of the 1999–2000 season, Pleuler played 19 times, scoring once, in a season that would see Ulm relegated back to the 2. Bundesliga following a 16th-placed finish.

Later career
Pleuler left Ulm in 2000, and went on to play for Stuttgarter Kickers, UTA Arad and Darmstadt 98 before returning to Ulm in 2004. Pleuler joined SpVgg Au/Iller as a player-manager in 2005 before retiring in 2007.

Managerial career
Pleuler was manager of SpVgg Au/Iller from 2005 until 2009, when he joined TSG Thannhausen as manager. Pleuler was sacked in December 2009 following a poor start to the season.

On 10 April 2012, Pleuler was appointed as manager of FC Albstadt 07, following the departure of Öner Topal. On 11 March 2015, Pleuler announced he would resign at the end of the season, following three years at the club.

On 27 July 2016, Pleuler was appointed manager of FC Sportfreunde Heppenheim. After two years, he was sacked in November 2018 after a run of poor results.

Personal life
Pleuler lives in Bensheim and has two children.

References

External links
 
 
 
 Markus Pleuler at kickersarchiv.de

Living people
1970 births
People from Bad Urach
Sportspeople from Tübingen (region)
West German footballers
German footballers
Footballers from Baden-Württemberg
Association football midfielders
Bundesliga players
2. Bundesliga players
Regionalliga players
Oberliga (football) players
Liga I players
SSV Reutlingen 05 players
SSV Ulm 1846 players
Stuttgarter Kickers players
FC UTA Arad players
SV Darmstadt 98 players
SpVgg Au/Iller players
German football managers
German expatriate footballers
German expatriate sportspeople in Romania
Expatriate footballers in Romania